HD 128333 or CH Boötis is an irregular variable star in the northern constellation of Boötes. It is currently on the asymptotic giant branch of the HR diagram.

References

External links
 HR 5452 VizieR Bright Star Catalog entry
 Image HD 128333

Boötes
128333
071280
M-type giants
5452
Boötis, CH
Slow irregular variables
Durchmusterung objects